The 2013 Tro-Bro Léon was the 30th edition of the Tro-Bro Léon cycle race and was held on 14 April 2013. The race was won by Francis Mourey.

General classification

References

2013
2013 in road cycling
2013 in French sport